TCAD may stand for one of the following:

TCAD (Borland), a component of Borland Delphi and C++ Builder to facilitate writing vector graphics applications
Technology CAD, computer-aided design for semiconductor process technology and semiconductor device design
 Traffic Collision Avoidance Device
Tricyclic antidepressants, a class of medications which block serotonin and norepinephrine reuptake in the brain.